Gentleman Jack is a historical drama television series created by Sally Wainwright. Set in the 1830s in Yorkshire, it stars Suranne Jones as landowner and industrialist Anne Lister. The series is based on the collected diaries of Lister, which contain over four million words and are written largely in secret code, documenting a lifetime of lesbian relationships.

Gentleman Jack is a BBC One and HBO co-production. The series premiered on 22 April 2019 in the United States, and on 19 May 2019 in the United Kingdom. It was renewed by the BBC on 23 May 2019 for a second series, which was shown on BBC One from 10 April to 29 May 2022 and on HBO from 25 April to 13 June 2022. In July 2022, co-production company HBO said it would not be proceeding with a third series. The BBC wants to continue with the programme, but needs to find a production partner to continue with it.

Overview

In 1832, Miss Anne Lister leaves Hastings brokenhearted and heads to the lush landscape of Halifax, West Yorkshire, England to restore her uncle's estate that she has inherited. While restoring the estate she finds that the family land has a coal mine and that it is being stolen by two brothers. This unusual lady landowner develops a potentially dangerous romance with a woman named Ann Walker, which she records in a cryptic diary.

Cast and characters

Main
 Suranne Jones as Anne Lister
 Sophie Rundle as Ann Walker, Anne Lister's fiancée, and later, wife.
 Joe Armstrong as Samuel Washington, land steward for both Ann Walker and Anne Lister
 Amelia Bullmore as Eliza Priestley, wife of William Priestley
 Rosie Cavaliero as Elizabeth Cordingley, cook-housekeeper for the Listers and former lady's maid to Anne Lister
 Gemma Whelan as Marian Lister, Anne Lister's sister
 Gemma Jones as Aunt Anne Lister
 Timothy West as Capt. Jeremy Lister, Anne Lister's father
 Tom Lewis as Thomas Sowden, one of Anne Lister's tenants

Recurring

 Stephanie Cole as Aunt Ann Walker
 George Costigan as James Holt, who works for Anne Lister and helps with managing her coal business
 Peter Davison as William Priestley, Ann Walker's cousin and one of the trustees of her entailed estate
 Shaun Dooley as Jeremiah Rawson, Ann Walker's cousin and Christopher Rawson's brother
 Vincent Franklin as Christopher Rawson, a magistrate and Ann Walker's cousin
 Lydia Leonard as Marianna Lawton, Anne Lister's ex-lover with whom she occasionally sleeps
 Katherine Kelly as Elizabeth Sutherland, Ann Walker's sister who lives in Scotland with her husband and children
 Derek Riddell as Elizabeth's husband, Captain Sutherland
 Amy James-Kelly as Suzannah Washington, eldest daughter of Samuel Washington
 Thomas Howes as John Booth, head gardener for the Listers
 Albane Courtois as Eugénie Pierre, Anne Lister's femme de chambre or French lady's maid
 Ben Hunter as Joseph Booth, the Listers' manservant and brother of John Booth
Daniel Weyman as Dr Kenny, the local doctor for Ann Walker, Aunt Anne Lister, Capt. Jeremy Lister and Henry Hardcastle
 John Hollingworth as Mr Abbott, Marian Lister's suitor
 Saul Marron as James Mackenzie, Ann Walker's manservant

Guest

 Anthony Flanagan as Samuel Sowden, Thomas Sowden's alcoholic and violent father, and as Ben Sowden, Samuel Sowden's brother and Thomas's uncle
 Rupert Vansittart as Charles Lawton, Marianna Lawton's husband
 Sylvia Syms as Mrs. Rawson, mother of Christopher Rawson and Jeremiah Rawson
 Brendan Patricks as Reverend Thomas Ainsworth, a man who raped Ann Walker and later proposes to her
 Jodhi May as Vere Hobart, later Lady Vere Cameron, Anne Lister's former traveling companion and unrequited love
 Sofie Gråbøl as Queen Marie of Denmark
 Stephanie Hyam as Sophie Ferrall
 Julie Agnete Vang as Countess (Emily) Blücher, Sophie's elder sister
 Joanna Scanlan as Anne Lister's former lover, Isabella "Tib" Norcliffe

Episodes

Series 1 (2019)

Series 2 (2022)

Background and production
In November 2016, screenwriter Sally Wainwright was awarded a £30,000 screenwriting fellowship grant from the charitable organisation the Wellcome Trust, in partnership with Film4 and the British Film Institute. Wainwright disclosed to the media that she was writing a drama series about the landowner, industrialist, and intellectual Anne Lister and would use the grant to further her research. In March 2017, it was announced that BBC One and American network HBO had commissioned the eight-part series, provisionally titled "Shibden Hall", after Lister's ancestral home of the same name. Wainwright was announced as the series' director, and executive producer together with Piers Wenger and Faith Penhale. A native of Yorkshire, Wainwright had grown up in the environs of Shibden Hall and had had ambitions to write a drama based on Anne Lister for over 20 years. She described Lister as "a gift to a dramatist" and "one of the most exuberant, thrilling and brilliant women in British history". 

In July 2017, the series was renamed Gentleman Jack and Suranne Jones was announced in the protagonist role of Lister. Wainwright, who had previously worked with Jones in Scott & Bailey and Unforgiven, deemed her capable of embodying the "boldness, subtlety, energy and humour" required to depict Lister. In April 2018, Sophie Rundle joined the production as Ann Walker, Lister's intended spouse.

In November 2018, Katherine Kelly was cast in the role of Ann Walker's sister, Elizabeth Sutherland, Sofie Gråbøl as Queen Marie of Denmark and Tom Lewis as Thomas Sowden.

HBO cancelled the programme on 7 July 2022, after two series.

Music
The theme music was composed by Murray Gold. The series' ending theme song is "Gentleman Jack", written and performed by Yorkshire folk music duo O'Hooley & Tidow and first released in 2012.

Filming

Location shooting took place in Yorkshire and surrounding areas, including Shibden Hall as Anne Lister's home and Sutton Park, Yorkshire as Ann Walker's home.

The final scenes of series one were shot in Goodramgate and Precentor's Court in York. Three other locations in York – Duncombe Place, Minster Yard and Holy Trinity Church – were used earlier in the series.

Production on series two, delayed due to the COVID-19 pandemic, resumed in October 2020. It then shut down again and resumed filming in the summer of 2021. Suranne Jones confirmed that filming for the second series had concluded on 4 October 2021. Historically there were a number of coal mining pits in the Shibden Valley in Lister's time; one still standing, located close to Bare Head Tunnel, was used for filming in episode six.

Release
BBC One released a teaser trailer for series one on 8 March 2019, followed by the first official trailer on 18 March 2019. The first trailer from HBO was also released on 18 March 2019.

Broadcast
Gentleman Jack premiered first in the US on 22 April 2019; followed by the UK premiere on 19 May 2019. The first series premiered in Australia on Fox Showcase on 19 May 2019.

Reception
The Hollywood Reporter described Gentleman Jack as a "funny, smart, and touching story" which at times has the main character talk to the camera to explain her inner thoughts, allowing aspects of Lister's diary to be used. The Guardian'''s review said "Suranne Jones rocks Halifax as the first modern lesbian...Anne Lister's diary [becomes] a thrilling coal-town romp that flirts with parody, so maybe it's Queer Brontë." Variety pointed up the drama's uniqueness: "Wainwright makes an intriguing choice that sets up a decidedly adult romance about devotion, trust and partnership that is rare for TV in general, let alone for lesbian characters in a period piece."

The second season also received critical acclaim. On Rotten Tomatoes, it has a rating of 95%, based on 21 critic reviews, with an average rating of 8.1/10. The site's consensus reads, "Blessed with Suranne Jones' exquisite performance and some of the crispest dialogue on television, Gentleman Jack remains a total ace." The Guardian gave a 5 out of 5 star review for season 2, writing: "It is a masterpiece... One of the greatest British period dramas of our time … Suranne Jones is an alchemical force of nature in the gleeful, radical return of this rollicking, romantic and exquisitely scripted show." Radio Times wrote of season 2: "The show has lost none of its brilliance, nor has Wainwright dislodged its heart and soul – she has only added to it. Gentleman Jack remains a bold and transgressive figure not just for a period drama, but mainstream TV in general, and season 2 another emotional ride."

At the time of cancellation, it was noted that the second season registered amongst HBO's lowest-rated current original series by net viewership. Nonetheless, reports surfaced that the BBC may pursue production of a third season without HBO following the BBC's statement: "We are tremendously proud of Gentleman Jack, a show which has made a huge cultural impact, and we are in discussions with Sally about what’s next." As of early 2023, however, there have been no official announcements regarding the show's future.

After it was known that the programme would be discontinued after the second series, The Guardian published reactions by many people who described how it had powerfully affected their lives for the good.

Awards and nominations

Book
The series tie-in paperback book was released on 25 April 2019 in the United Kingdom by BBC Books under the title Gentleman Jack: The Real Anne Lister, and on 4 June 2019 in the United States by Penguin Random House as Gentleman Jack: The Diaries of Anne Lister. The book was written by Anne Choma,  the historical adviser for the series.

See alsoThe Secret Diaries of Miss Anne Lister'' – 2010 BBC Two drama film about Anne Lister

Notes

References

External links
 
  Gentleman Jack at HBO
 
 

2019 American television series debuts
2019 British television series debuts
2022 American television series endings
2022 British television series endings
2010s American drama television series
2010s American LGBT-related drama television series
2010s British drama television series
2010s British LGBT-related drama television series
2020s American drama television series
2020s American LGBT-related drama television series
2020s British drama television series
2020s British LGBT-related drama television series
American biographical series
BBC television dramas
Biographical television series
Cross-dressing in television
English-language television shows
HBO original programming
Lesbian-related television shows
Serial drama television series
Television series about same-sex marriage
Television series by BBC Studios
Television series created by Sally Wainwright
Television series set in the 1830s
Television shows about landlords
Television shows set in Yorkshire 
Television shows shot in Liverpool